The golden loaches (Sabanejewia) are a genus of ray-finned fish in the family Cobitidae.

Species
There are currently 10 recognized species in this genus:
 Sabanejewia aurata (De Filippi, 1863)
 Sabanejewia aurata aralensis (Kessler, 1877) (Aral spined loach)
 Sabanejewia aurata aurata (De Filippi, 1863) (golden spined loach)
 Sabanejewia balcanica (S. L. Karaman, 1922) (Balkan golden loach)
 Sabanejewia baltica Witkowski, 1994 (Northern golden loach)
 Sabanejewia bulgarica (Drensky, 1928)
 Sabanejewia caspia (Eichwald, 1838) (Caspian spined loach)
 Sabanejewia caucasica (L. S. Berg, 1906) (Ciscaucasian spined loach)
 Sabanejewia kubanica Vasil'eva & Vasil'ev, 1988
 Sabanejewia larvata (De Filippi, 1859) (Italian loach)
 Sabanejewia romanica (Băcescu, 1943) (Romanian loach)
 Sabanejewia vallachica (Nalbant, 1957) (Eastern Carpathian golden loach)

References 

Cobitidae
Freshwater fish of Asia
Freshwater fish of Europe
Taxonomy articles created by Polbot